An application layer is an abstraction layer that specifies the shared communications protocols and interface methods used by hosts in a communications network. An application layer abstraction is specified in both the Internet Protocol Suite (TCP/IP) and the OSI model. Although both models use the same term for their respective highest-level layer, the detailed definitions and purposes are different.

Internet protocol suite

In the Internet protocol suite, the application layer contains the communications protocols and interface methods used in process-to-process communications across an Internet Protocol (IP) computer network. The application layer only standardizes communication and depends upon the underlying transport layer protocols to establish host-to-host data transfer channels and manage the data exchange in a client–server or peer-to-peer networking model. Though the TCP/IP application layer does not describe specific rules or data formats that applications must consider when communicating, the original specification (in ) does rely on and recommend the robustness principle for application design.

OSI model

In the OSI model, the definition of the application layer is narrower in scope. The OSI model defines the application layer as only the interface responsible for communicating with host-based and user-facing applications. OSI then explicitly distinguishes the functionality of two additional layers, the session layer and presentation layer, as separate levels below the application layer and above the transport layer. OSI specifies a strict modular separation of functionality at these layers and provides protocol implementations for each. In contrast, the Internet Protocol Suite compiles these functions into a single layer.

Sublayers
Originally the OSI model consisted of two kinds of application layer services with their related protocols. These two sublayers are the common application service element (CASE) and specific application service element (SASE). Generally, an application layer protocol is realized by the use of the functionality of a number of application service elements. Some application service elements invoke different procedures based on the version of the session service available.

CASE
The common application service element sublayer provides services for the application layer and request services from the session layer.
It provides support for common application services, such as:
 ACSE (Association Control Service Element)
 ROSE (Remote Operation Service Element)
 CCR (Commitment Concurrency and Recovery)
 RTSE (Reliable Transfer Service Element)

SASE
The specific application service element sublayer provides application-specific services (protocols), such as:
 FTAM (File Transfer, Access and Manager)
 VT (Virtual Terminal)
 MOTIS (Message Oriented Text Interchange Standard)
 CMIP (Common Management Information Protocol)
 JTM (Job Transfer and Manipulation)
 MMS (Manufacturing Messaging Specification)
 RDA (Remote Database Access)
 DTP (Distributed Transaction Processing)

Protocols
The IETF definition document for the application layer in the Internet Protocol Suite is RFC 1123. It provided an initial set of protocols that covered the major aspects of the functionality of the early Internet:
 Hypertext documents: Hypertext Transfer Protocol (HTTP)
 Remote login to hosts: Telnet, Secure Shell
 File transfer: File Transfer Protocol (FTP), Trivial File Transfer Protocol (TFTP)
 Electronic mail transport: Simple Mail Transfer Protocol (SMTP)
 Networking support: Domain Name System (DNS)
 Host initialization: BOOTP
 Remote host management: Simple Network Management Protocol (SNMP), Common Management Information Protocol over TCP (CMOT)

Examples
Additional notable application-layer protocols include the following:

9P, Plan 9 from Bell Labs distributed file system protocol
AFP, Apple Filing Protocol
APPC, Advanced Program-to-Program Communication
AMQP, Advanced Message Queuing Protocol
Atom Publishing Protocol
BEEP, Block Extensible Exchange Protocol
Bitcoin
BitTorrent
CFDP, Coherent File Distribution Protocol
CoAP, Constrained Application Protocol
DDS, Data Distribution Service
DeviceNet
eDonkey
ENRP, Endpoint Handlespace Redundancy Protocol
FastTrack (KaZaa, Grokster, iMesh)
Finger, User Information Protocol
Freenet
FTAM, File Transfer Access and Management
FTP, File Transfer Protocol
Gemini, Gemini protocol
Gopher, Gopher protocol
HL7, Health Level Seven
HTTP, Hypertext Transfer Protocol
Hypercore, formerly dat://
H.323, Packet-Based Multimedia Communications System
IMAP, Internet Message Access Protocol
IRC, Internet Relay Chat
IPFS, InterPlanetary File System 
Kademlia
LDAP, Lightweight Directory Access Protocol
LPD, Line Printer Daemon Protocol
MIME (S-MIME), Multipurpose Internet Mail Extensions and Secure MIME
Modbus
MQTT Protocol
Netconf
NFS, Network File System
NIS, Network Information Service
NNTP, Network News Transfer Protocol
NTCIP, National Transportation Communications for Intelligent Transportation System Protocol
NTP, Network Time Protocol
OSCAR, AOL Instant Messenger Protocol
POP, Post Office Protocol
PNRP, Peer Name Resolution Protocol
RDP, Remote Desktop Protocol
RELP, Reliable Event Logging Protocol
RFB, Remote Framebuffer Protocol
Rlogin, Remote Login in UNIX Systems
RPC, Remote Procedure Call
RTMP, Real Time Messaging Protocol
RTP, Real-time Transport Protocol
RTPS, Real Time Publish Subscribe
RTSP, Real Time Streaming Protocol
SAP, Session Announcement Protocol
SDP, Session Description Protocol
SIP, Session Initiation Protocol
SLP, Service Location Protocol
SMB, Server Message Block
SMTP, Simple Mail Transfer Protocol
SNTP, Simple Network Time Protocol
SSH, Secure Shell
SSMS, Secure SMS Messaging Protocol
TCAP, Transaction Capabilities Application Part
TDS, Tabular Data Stream
Tor (anonymity network)
Tox
TSP, Time Stamp Protocol
VTP, Virtual Terminal Protocol
Whois (and RWhois), Remote Directory Access Protocol
WebDAV
WebRTC
WebSocket
X.400, Message Handling Service Protocol
X.500, Directory Access Protocol (DAP)
XMPP, Extensible Messaging and Presence Protocol
Z39.50 
DNS, Domain Name Services

References

External links

OSI model